The flag of Puntland is the state flag of Puntland, an autonomous state in northeastern Somalia.

History
Puntland initially used a variation of the flag of Somalia as its provincial flag. On 22 December 2009, the regional parliament introduced a new state flag. The flag design was decided on by a commission consisting of government officials and local intellectuals.

Colors and symbolization
The Puntland flag consists of three colors: white, blue and green.

Top: the blue stripe with the white star in the center symbolizes the flag of Somalia
Center: the white stripe in the center represents peace and stability in the region
Bottom: the green stripe symbolizes the natural wealth of the Puntland State of Somalia

Different flags

References
Flag of Puntland

Puntland
Flags of Somalia
2009 establishments in Somalia